Heath Hill was a railway station on the Strzelecki line in South Gippsland, Victoria, Australia. The station was opened on 29 June 1922, and closed on 7 August 1941 following flooding of the Lang Lang River, which resulted in damages to one of the four trestle bridges over the river, after which the line was closed back to Yannathan station.

Station facilities
Upon opening of the line in 1922 Heath Hill station was supplied with goods loading and storage facilities, passenger facilities and departmental residence.

References

Disused railway stations in Victoria (Australia)
Shire of Baw Baw